Peter Neville George Mountford (born 21 June 1940) is a former English first-class cricketer.

Peter Mountford was educated at Bromsgrove School and Keble College, Oxford. An opening bowler, he played several matches for Oxford University in 1962 without establishing himself in the team.

He had one outstanding performance, in May 1963, when Oxford played the touring West Indians at The Parks. In damp conditions, the West Indians dismissed Oxford for 119, but then Mountford was able to exploit the conditions and, swinging the ball away from the bat, took 7 for 47 to dismiss the West Indians for 107. He maintained his place for the rest of the season. His last first-class match was against Cambridge University that year, when he dismissed Mike Brearley twice, for 3 and 0.

Mountford played for the second elevens of Warwickshire, Worcestershire and Hampshire between 1962 and 1969 without playing first-eleven cricket.

References

External links
 

1940 births
Living people
Cricketers from Birmingham, West Midlands
People educated at Bromsgrove School
Alumni of Keble College, Oxford
English cricketers
Oxford University cricketers
English cricketers of 1946 to 1968